The Hebrew Bible or Tanakh (Hebrew:  Tānāḵ), also known in Hebrew as Miqra (Hebrew:  Mīqrāʾ), is the canonical collection of Hebrew scriptures, including the Torah, the Nevi'im, and the Ketuvim. Different branches of Judaism and Samaritanism have maintained different versions of the canon, including the 3rd-century Septuagint text used in Second Temple Judaism, the Syriac Peshitta, the Samaritan Pentateuch, the Dead Sea Scrolls, and most recently the 10th-century medieval Masoretic Text compiled by the Masoretes, currently used in Rabbinic Judaism. The terms "Hebrew Bible" or "Hebrew Canon" are frequently confused with the Masoretic Text, however, this is a medieval version and one of several texts considered authoritative by different types of Judaism throughout history. The current edition of the Masoretic Text is mostly in Biblical Hebrew, with a few passages in Biblical Aramaic (in the books of Daniel and Ezra, and the verse Jeremiah 10:11).

The authoritative form of the modern Hebrew Bible used in Rabbinic Judaism is the Masoretic Text (7th to 10th century CE), which consists of 24 books, divided into pesuqim (verses). The Hebrew Bible developed during the Second Temple Period, as the Jews decided which religious texts were of divine origin; the Masoretic Text, compiled by the Jewish scribes and scholars of the Early Middle Ages, comprises the Hebrew and Aramaic 24 books that they considered authoritative.

The Hellenized Greek-speaking Jews of Alexandria produced a Greek translation of the Hebrew Bible called "the Septuagint", that included books later identified as the Apocrypha, while the Samaritans produced their own edition of the Torah, the Samaritan Pentateuch; according to the Dutch–Israeli biblical scholar and linguist Emanuel Tov, professor of Bible Studies at the Hebrew University of Jerusalem, both of these ancient editions of the Hebrew Bible differ significantly from the medieval Masoretic Text. Currently, all the main non-Protestant (Roman Catholic, Eastern Orthodox, and Oriental Orthodox) Christian denominations accept as canonical the Deuterocanonical books, which were excluded from the modern Hebrew Bible and the Protestant Bible. The ancient translations of the Hebrew Bible currently used by the Roman Catholic and Eastern Orthodox churches are based on the Septuagint, which was considered the authoritative scriptural canon by the early Christians. The Septuagint was influential on early Christianity as it was the Hellenistic Greek translation of the Hebrew Bible primarily used by the 1st-century Christian authors.

The contents of the Masoretic Text are similar, but not identical, to those of the Protestant Old Testament, in which the material is divided into 39 books and arranged in a different order. This is due to the Tiberian Hebrew-Masoretic Text having been considered the "original" Hebrew text across Europe during the Renaissance. Biblical scholars within the Catholic Church started to treat these books differently due to this misunderstanding of the Masoretic Text, and Martin Luther took this understanding even further due to the ad fontes ("to the sources") principle of Renaissance humanism. Luther didn't know that the Masoretic Text was a recent edition of the Hebrew Bible when using it to justify removing 7 books from the Christian Old Testament. 

In addition to the Masoretic Text, modern biblical scholars seeking to understand the history of the Hebrew Bible use a range of sources. These include the Septuagint, the Syriac language Peshitta translation, the Samaritan Pentateuch, the Dead Sea Scrolls collection, and quotations from rabbinic manuscripts. These sources may be older than the Masoretic Text in some cases and often differ from it. These differences have given rise to the theory that yet another text, an Urtext of the Hebrew Bible, once existed and is the source of the versions extant today. However, such an Urtext has never been found, and which of the three commonly known versions (Septuagint, Masoretic Text, Samaritan Pentateuch) is closest to the Urtext is debated.

The name "Tanakh"

Tanakh is an acronym, made from the first Hebrew letter of each of the Masoretic Text's three traditional divisions: Torah (literally 'Instruction' or 'Law'), Nevi'im (Prophets), and Ketuvim (Writings)—hence TaNaKh.

The three-part division reflected in the acronym Tanakh is well attested in the rabbinic literature. During that period, however, Tanakh was not used. Instead, the proper title was Mikra (or Miqra, מקרא, meaning reading or that which is read) because the biblical texts were read publicly. The acronym 'Tanakh' is first recorded in the medieval era. Mikra continues to be used in Hebrew to this day, alongside Tanakh, to refer to the Hebrew scriptures. In modern spoken Hebrew, they are interchangeable.

The term "Hebrew Bible"

Many biblical studies scholars advocate use of the term Hebrew Bible (or Hebrew Scriptures) as a substitute for less-neutral terms with Jewish or Christian connotations (e.g. Tanakh or Old Testament). The Society of Biblical Literature's Handbook of Style, which is the standard for major academic journals like the Harvard Theological Review and conservative Protestant journals like the Bibliotheca Sacra and the Westminster Theological Journal, suggests that authors "be aware of the connotations of alternative expressions such as ... Hebrew Bible [and] Old Testament" without prescribing the use of either. Alister McGrath points out that while the term emphasizes that it is largely written in Hebrew and "is sacred to the Hebrew people", it "fails to do justice to the way in which Christianity sees an essential continuity between the Old and New Testaments", arguing that there is "no generally accepted alternative to the traditional term 'Old Testament'." However, he accepts that there is no reason why non-Christians should feel obliged to refer to these books as the Old Testament, "apart from custom of use".

Christianity has long asserted a close relationship between the Hebrew Bible and New Testament, although there have sometimes been movements like Marcionism (viewed as heretical by the early church) that have struggled with it. Modern Christian formulations of this tension include supersessionism, covenant theology, new covenant theology, dispensationalism, and dual-covenant theology. All of these formulations, except some forms of dual-covenant theology, are objectionable to mainstream Judaism and to many Jewish scholars and writers, for whom there is one eternal covenant between God and the Israelites, and who therefore reject the term "Old Testament" as a form of antinomianism.

Christian usage of the "Old Testament" does not refer to a universally agreed upon set of books but, rather, varies depending on denomination. Lutheranism and Protestant denominations that follow the Westminster Confession of Faith accept the entire Jewish canon as the Old Testament without additions, although in translation they sometimes give preference to the Septuagint (LXX) rather than the Masoretic Text; for example, see Isaiah 7:14.

"Hebrew" refers to the original language of the books, but it may also be taken as referring to the Jews of the Second Temple era and their descendants, who preserved the transmission of the Masoretic Text up to the present day. The Hebrew Bible includes small portions in Aramaic (mostly in the books of Daniel and Ezra), written and printed in Aramaic square-script, which was adopted as the Hebrew alphabet after the Babylonian exile.

Development and codification

There is no scholarly consensus as to when the Hebrew Bible canon was fixed: some scholars argue that it was fixed by the Hasmonean dynasty, while others argue it was not fixed until the second century CE or even later.

According to Louis Ginzberg's Legends of the Jews, the twenty-four book canon of the Hebrew Bible was fixed by Ezra and the scribes in the Second Temple period.

According to the Talmud, much of the Tanakh was compiled by the men of the Great Assembly (Anshei K'nesset HaGedolah), a task completed in 450 BCE, and it has remained unchanged ever since.

The 24-book canon is mentioned in the Midrash Koheleth 12:12: Whoever brings together in his house more than twenty four books brings confusion.

Language and pronunciation
The original writing system of the Hebrew text was an abjad: consonants written with some applied vowel letters ("matres lectionis"). During the early Middle Ages, scholars known as the Masoretes created a single formalized system of vocalization. This was chiefly done by Aaron ben Moses ben Asher, in the Tiberias school, based on the oral tradition for reading the Tanakh, hence the name Tiberian vocalization. It also included some innovations of Ben Naftali and the Babylonian exiles. Despite the comparatively late process of codification, some traditional sources and some Orthodox Jews hold the pronunciation and cantillation to derive from the revelation at Sinai, since it is impossible to read the original text without pronunciations and cantillation pauses. The combination of a text ( mikra), pronunciation ( niqqud) and cantillation ( te`amim) enable the reader to understand both the simple meaning and the nuances in sentence flow of the text.

Number of different words used
The number of distinct words in the Hebrew Bible is 8,679, of which 1,480 are hapax legomena, words or expressions that occur only once. The number of distinct Semitic roots, on which many of these biblical words are based, is roughly 2000.

Books of the Tanakh
The Tanakh consists of twenty-four books, counting as one book each 1 Samuel and 2 Samuel, 1 Kings and 2 Kings, 1 Chronicles and 2 Chronicles, and Ezra–Nehemiah. The Twelve Minor Prophets are also counted as a single book. In Hebrew, the books are often referred to by their prominent first words.

Torah

The Torah (literally "teaching") is also known as the "Pentateuch", or as the "Five Books of Moses".
  (literally "In the beginning") – Genesis
  (literally "The names of") – Exodus
  (literally "And He called") – Leviticus
  (literally "In the desert of") – Numbers
  (literally "Things" or "Words") – Deuteronomy

Nevi'im

Nevi'im ("Prophets") is the second main division of the Tanakh, between the Torah and Ketuvim. This division includes the books which cover the time from the entrance of the Israelites into the Land of Israel until the Babylonian captivity of Judah (the "period of prophecy"). Their distribution is not chronological, but substantive.

The Former Prophets
  – Joshua
  – Judges
  – Samuel
  – Kings

The Latter Prophets
  – Isaiah
  – Jeremiah
  – Ezekiel

The Twelve Minor Prophets ("The Twelve"), which are considered one book:
  – Hosea
  – Joel
  – Amos
  – Obadiah
  – Jonah
  – Micah
  – Nahum
  – Habakkuk
  – Zephaniah
  – Haggai
  – Zechariah
  – Malachi

Ketuvim

 ("Writings") consists of eleven books.

Poetic books

In Masoretic manuscripts (and some printed editions), Psalms, Proverbs and Job are presented in a special two-column form emphasizing the parallel stichs in the verses, which are a function of their poetry.

These three books are also the only ones in Tanakh with a special system of cantillation notes that are designed to emphasize parallel stichs within verses. However, the beginning and end of the book of Job are in the normal prose system.

  – Psalms
  – Proverbs
  – Job

Five scrolls

These are the latest books collected and designated as "authoritative" in the Jewish canon, with the latest parts having dates ranging into the 2nd century BCE. These scrolls are traditionally read over the course of the year in many Jewish communities.

These books are read aloud in the synagogue on particular occasions, the occasion listed below in parenthesis.
  – Song of Songs, also known as Song of Solomon (on Passover)
  – Ruth (on Shavuot)
  – Lamentations (on Tisha B'Av)
  – Ecclesiastes (on Sukkot)
  – Esther (on Purim)

Other books
Besides the three poetic books and the five scrolls, the remaining books in Ketuvim are Daniel, Ezra–Nehemiah and Chronicles. Although there is no formal grouping for these books in the Jewish tradition, they nevertheless share a number of distinguishing characteristics.
 Their narratives all openly describe relatively late events (i.e. the Babylonian captivity and the subsequent restoration of Zion).
 The Talmudic tradition ascribes late authorship to all of them.
 Two of them (Daniel and Ezra) are the only books in Tanakh with significant portions in Aramaic.

  – Daniel
  – Ezra and Nehemiah
  – Chronicles

Book order
The Jewish textual tradition never finalized the order of the books in Ketuvim. The Babylonian Talmud (Bava Batra 14b – 15a) gives their order as Ruth, Psalms, Job, Proverbs, Ecclesiastes, Song of Songs, Lamentations, Daniel, Scroll of Esther, Ezra, Chronicles.

In Tiberian Masoretic codices, including the Aleppo Codex and the Leningrad Codex, and often in old Spanish manuscripts as well, the order is Chronicles, Psalms, Job, Proverbs, Ruth, Song of Songs, Ecclesiastes, Lamentations, Esther, Daniel, Ezra.

Nach
Nach, also anglicized , refers to the Nevi'im and Ketuvim portions of Tanakh. Nach is often referred to as its own subject, separate from Torah.

It is a major subject in the curriculum of Orthodox high schools for girls and in the seminaries which they subsequently attend, and is often taught by different teachers than those who teach Chumash. The curriculum of Orthodox high schools for boys includes only some portions of Nach, such as the book of Joshua, the book of Judges, and the Five Megillot.
See .

Translations

 The Holy Scriptures According to the Masoretic Text: A New Translation with the aid of Previous Versions & with the Constant Consultation of Jewish Authorities was published in 1917 by the Jewish Publication Society. It was replaced by their Tanakh in 1985
 Tanakh, Jewish Publication Society, 1985, 
 Tanach: The Stone Edition, Hebrew with English translation, Mesorah Publications, 1996, named after benefactor Irving I. Stone.
 Tanakh Ram, an ongoing translation to Modern Hebrew (2010–) by Avraham Ahuvya (RAM Publishing House Ltd. and Miskal Ltd.)
 The Living Torah and The Living Nach, a 1981 translation of the Torah by Rabbi Aryeh Kaplan and a subsequent posthumous translation of the Nevi'im and Ketuvim following the model of the first volume
 The Koren Jerusalem Bible is a Hebrew/English Tanakh by Koren Publishers Jerusalem and was the first Bible published in modern Israel in 1962

Jewish commentaries

The major commentary used for the Chumash is the Rashi commentary. The Rashi commentary and Metzudot commentary are the major commentaries for the Nach.

There are two major approaches to the study of, and commentary on, the Tanakh. In the Jewish community, the classical approach is a religious study of the Bible, where it is assumed that the Bible is divinely inspired. Another approach is to study the Bible as a human creation. In this approach, Biblical studies can be considered as a sub-field of religious studies. The latter practice, when applied to the Torah, is considered heresy by the Orthodox Jewish community. As such, much modern day Bible commentary written by non-Orthodox authors is considered forbidden by rabbis teaching in Orthodox yeshivas. Some classical rabbinic commentators, such as Abraham Ibn Ezra, Gersonides, and Maimonides, used many elements of contemporary biblical criticism, including their knowledge of history, science, and philology. Their use of historical and scientific analysis of the Bible was considered acceptable by historic Judaism due to the author's faith commitment to the idea that God revealed the Torah to Moses on Mount Sinai.

The Modern Orthodox Jewish community allows for a wider array of biblical criticism to be used for biblical books outside of the Torah, and a few Orthodox commentaries now incorporate many of the techniques previously found in the
academic world, e.g. the Da'at Miqra series. Non-Orthodox Jews, including those affiliated with Conservative Judaism and Reform Judaism, accept both traditional and secular approaches to Bible studies. "Jewish commentaries on the Bible", discusses Jewish Tanakh commentaries from the Targums to classical rabbinic literature, the midrash literature, the classical medieval commentators, and modern-day commentaries.

See also

 613 commandments, formal list of Jewish 613 commandments
 929: Tanakh B'yachad
 Hebrew University Bible Project
 Jewish English Bible translations
 Mikraot Gedolot
 New Jewish Publication Society of America Tanakh
 Non-canonical books referenced in the Bible
 Weekly Torah portion

References
Footnotes

Sources

Further reading
 
 Kuntz, John Kenneth. The People of Ancient Israel: an introduction to Old Testament Literature, History, and Thought, Harper and Row, 1974. 
 Leiman, Sid. The Canonization of Hebrew Scripture. (Hamden, CT: Archon, 1976).
 Levenson, Jon. Sinai and Zion: An Entry into the Jewish Bible. (San Francisco: Harper San Francisco, 1985).
 
 Noth, Martin. A History of Pentateuchal Traditions. (1948; trans. by Bernhard Anderson; Atlanta: Scholars, 1981).
 Schmid, Konrad. The Old Testament: A Literary History. (Minneapolis: Fortress Press, 2012).

External links

 Judaica Press Translation of Tanakh with Rashi's commentary Free online translation of Tanakh and Rashi's entire commentary
 Mikraot Gedolot (Rabbinic Bible) at Wikisource in English (sample) and Hebrew (sample)
 A Guide to Reading Nevi'im and Ketuvim – Detailed Hebrew outlines of the biblical books based on the natural flow of the text (rather than the chapter divisions). The outlines include a daily study-cycle, and the explanatory material is in English, by Seth (Avi) Kadish.
 Tanakh Hebrew Bible Project—An online project that aims to present critical text of the Hebrew Bible with important ancient versions (Samaritan Pentateuch, Masoretic Text, Targum Onkelos, Samaritan Targum, Septuagint, Peshitta, Aquila of Sinope, Symmachus, Theodotion, Vetus Latina, and Vulgate) in parallel with new English translation for each version, plus a comprehensive critical apparatus and a textual commentary for every verse.

 
Ancient Jewish literature
Ancient Hebrew texts